Benjamin Joshua Bryant (born 15 December 1994) is an English-born Australian former first-class cricketer.

Bryant was born at Lambeth in December 1994, emigrating to Australia with his parents when he was a child. He was educated in Sydney at Scots College, before attending the University of Sydney. In 2015–16, he took undertook an exchange year in England at Anglia Ruskin University. While studying at Anglia Ruskin, he made two appearances for Cambridge MCCU against Essex and Nottinghamshire in 2016. He also played minor counties cricket for Cambridgeshire in 2015 and 2016, making six appearances in the Minor Counties Championship, and a single appearance each in both the MCCA Knockout Trophy and the Minor Counties T20.

References

External links

1994 births
Living people
People from Lambeth
Australian people of English descent
People educated at Scots College (Sydney)
University of Sydney alumni
Alumni of Anglia Ruskin University
Australian cricketers
Cambridgeshire cricketers
Cambridge MCCU cricketers